Diskord is a band from Oslo. The band was started in 1999. Diskord's music can be categorized as doomy, progressive/technical death metal, while several critics have labeled the band as hard to classify genre-wise. Nevertheless, their releases have been critically acclaimed, as for instance evidenced by Austin Weber's piece in the No Clean Singing webzine: "Regardless of what comes out this year, I will be jamming Dystopics a lot; in retrospect. it’s my favorite death metal album from last year", and their inclusion in Norwegian newspaper Tønsberg Blad's list of best albums of the year.

The band has toured extensively and played a number of festivals including several appearances at the Inferno Metal Festival and by:Larm in Oslo, Mono Goes Metal and Kill-Town in Denmark, Old Grave fest in Bucharest, Hole in the Sky in Bergen, Szczecin Extreme Festival in Poland, Asakusa Deathfest in Japan. Diskord was supporting Nasum in Bologna and Possessed in Prague, Behemoth in South Africa, Johannesburg, toured with Dødheimsgard and Cryptic Brood in Europe.

In 2020, the band signed to Transcending Obscurity Records for the release of their upcoming full-length album

Band members 
Eyvind W. Axelsen – Bass guitar/Electric upright bass/vocals
Hans Jørgen Ersvik – Drums/vocals
Dmitry Sukhinin – Guitar/vocals

Former members 
Håvard Østli – guitar 2011 – 2014
Espen T. Hangård – guitar 2007 – 2011
Chris Myhre/Channard – guitar 1999 – 2007
Kvile – guitar 2001 – 2002

Videos 
 Horrid Engine
 A Downward Spire

Discography

Studio albums 
Doomscapes – Edgerunner Music, 2007
Dystopics – No Posers Please!, 2012
 Oscillations – Australopithecus Records (USA)/Hellthrasher Productions (Europe), 2014
 Degenerations – Transcending Obscurity Records, 2021

Demos and miscellaneous 
Demo 2001 – self-released, 2001
Aural Abjection – self-released, 2003
HDFH – Vendlus Records, 2005

References

External links
 Diskord official website

Norwegian death metal musical groups
Musical groups established in 1999
1999 establishments in Norway